Maximiliano Alejandro Velasco (born 19 June 1990) is an Argentine football player. He plays for Deportivo Llacuabamba in the Peruvian Primera División.

Club career
He made his Argentine Primera División debut for Newell's Old Boys on 11 June 2011 in a game against Olimpo.

References

External links
 

1990 births
People from Villa María
Sportspeople from Córdoba Province, Argentina
Living people
Argentine footballers
Argentine expatriate footballers
Newell's Old Boys footballers
Talleres de Córdoba footballers
Sportivo Belgrano footballers
San Martín de Tucumán footballers
Club Deportivo Universidad de San Martín de Porres players
Deportivo Municipal footballers
Sport Boys footballers
Valletta F.C. players
Guabirá players
Club Deportivo Universidad César Vallejo footballers
Bolivian Primera División players
Argentine Primera División players
Primera Nacional players
Peruvian Primera División players
Maltese Premier League players
Argentine expatriate sportspeople in Peru
Argentine expatriate sportspeople in Malta
Argentine expatriate sportspeople in Bolivia
Expatriate footballers in Peru
Expatriate footballers in Malta
Expatriate footballers in Bolivia
Association football forwards